Omorgus mictlensis is a species of hide beetle in the subfamily Omorginae.

References

mictlensis
Beetles described in 1995